Amber Dawn is a Canadian writer, who won the 2012 Dayne Ogilvie Prize, presented by the Writers' Trust of Canada to an emerging lesbian, gay, bisexual or transgender writer.

A writer, filmmaker, and performance artist based in Vancouver, British Columbia, Dawn published her debut novel Sub Rosa in 2010. The novel later won that year's Lambda Literary Award for Lesbian Debut Fiction. Dawn was also an editor of the anthology Fist of the Spider Woman: Tales of Fear and Queer Desire, a nominee for the Lambda Literary Award for Science Fiction, Fantasy and Horror in 2009, and co-editor with Trish Kelly of With a Rough Tongue: Femmes Write Porn. In 2013 she released a new book of essays and poems entitled How Poetry Saved My Life: A Hustler's Memoir. The book was a shortlisted nominee in the Lesbian Memoir/Biography category at the 26th Lambda Literary Awards, and won the 2013 City of Vancouver Book Award.

Dawn was director of programming for the Vancouver Queer Film Festival for four years, ending in 2012. In 2017, she rejoined the Vancouver Queer Film Festival as co-artistic director with Anoushka Ratnarajah.

She served alongside Vivek Shraya and Anne Fleming on the Dayne Ogilvie Prize jury in 2013, selecting C. E. Gatchalian as that year's winner.

Her novel, Sodom Road Exit, was published in 2018. It was shortlisted for the Lambda Literary Award for Lesbian Fiction at the 31st Lambda Literary Awards in 2019.

Bibliography

References

External links
Official Website
Amber Dawn at Arsenal Pulp Press

Canadian women novelists
Canadian women poets
Canadian memoirists
Canadian lesbian writers
Lambda Literary Award for Debut Fiction winners
Living people
Lesbian memoirists
Canadian LGBT poets
Canadian LGBT novelists
Canadian women memoirists
Canadian anthologists
Women anthologists
People from Fort Erie, Ontario
Writers from Ontario
21st-century Canadian novelists
21st-century Canadian poets
21st-century Canadian women writers
21st-century memoirists
21st-century Canadian LGBT people
Year of birth missing (living people)
Lesbian novelists